Pleasant is an unincorporated community in Pleasant Township, Switzerland County, in the U.S. state of Indiana.

History
A post office was established at Pleasant in 1829, and remained in operation until it was discontinued in 1917.

Geography

References

Unincorporated communities in Switzerland County, Indiana
Unincorporated communities in Indiana